Party Line with The Hearty Boys is a Food Network show hosted by real-life couple Dan Smith (b. July 16, 1962) and Steve McDonagh (b. June 14, 1964). Smith and McDonagh launched the show after winning the network's reality contest, The Next Food Network Star, which granted them a six-show Food Network series. The original series was entitled Party Line with Dan and Steve, but eventually the hosts were allowed to change the title in order to reflect and give credit to their independent Chicago catering business, The Hearty Boys, Co.

References

External links 
Party Line with The Hearty Boys on The Food Network
The Hearty Boys Online

Food Network original programming
2000s American LGBT-related television series
2006 American television series debuts
2006 American television series endings
2000s American cooking television series
English-language television shows